Rosyth  ("headland of Fife") is a town on the Firth of Forth,  south of the centre of Dunfermline. According to the census of 2011, the town has a population of 13,440.

The new town was founded as a Garden city-style suburb and naval dockyards in 1909, and was built as the coastal port of Dunfermline.  Rosyth is almost contiguous with neighbouring Inverkeithing, separated only by the M90 motorway. Rosyth railway station is on the Fife Circle Line.

Governance

Rosyth is within the Cowdenbeath constituency of the Scottish Parliament, currently held by Annabelle Ewing of the Scottish National Party, as well as the Mid Scotland and Fife electoral region. For the UK Parliament, Rosyth is located in the Dunfermline and West Fife Westminster constituency, currently held by Douglas Chapman MP for the Scottish National Party.

Rosyth has three representatives on Fife Council: Brian Goodall (Scottish National Party), Tony Jackson (Scottish National Party) and Andrew Verrecchia (Labour Party).

Docks

The area is best known for its large dockyard, formerly the Royal Naval Dockyard Rosyth, construction of which began in 1909. The town was planned as a garden city with accommodation for the construction workers and dockyard workers.

Rosyth and nearby Charlestown were major centres of shipbreaking activity, notably the salvage of much of the German fleet scuttled at Gutter Sound, Scapa Flow, the Cunard Line's RMS Mauretania, and the White Star Line's RMS Olympic.

The associated naval base closed in 1994, and no Royal Navy ships are permanently based at Rosyth, though small ships now return for docking and refit activities, including s.

Rosyth's dockyards became the very first in the Royal Navy to be privatised when Babcock International acquired the site in 1987.  The privatisation followed almost eighty years of contribution to the defence of the United Kingdom which spanned two World Wars and the Cold War with the Soviet Union, during which Rosyth became a key nuclear submarine maintenance establishment. When the final submarine refit finished in 2003, a project to undertake early nuclear decommissioning of the submarine refit and allied facilities – Project RD83 – began pre-planning. The project was funded by MoD, in accordance with the contractual agreement in place following the sale of the dockyard, but management and sub-contracting was the responsibility of the dockyard owner, Babcock Engineering Services, a member of the Babcock International Group. The main decommissioning sub-contractor is Edmund Nuttall, and work began in 2006. The work was completed in 2010, when most of the areas occupied by the submarine refit facilities had been returned to brownfield status and were ready for redevelopment. The project completed ahead of programme and under-budget, which is unusual in nuclear decommissioning activities. Some nuclear liabilities remain, including some quantities of contaminated ion-exchange resin which was the by-product of the former submarine refitting activity.

The dockyard was the site for final assembly of the two s for the Royal Navy's future carrier project.

The fifteenth century Rosyth Castle stands on the perimeter of the dockyard complex, at the entry to the ferry terminal, and was once surrounded by the Firth of Forth on almost all sides, until land reclamation by the docks in the early 1900s.

Military installations 
A number of Ministry of Defence establishments are located both in and around the Naval dockyard at Rosyth.

In November 2016 the UK Government announced that MoD Caledonia would close in 2022.

Ferry to Zeebrugge

Starting in 2002, an overnight ferry service linked Rosyth with Zeebrugge in Belgium. This service was discontinued by Superfast Ferries in September 2008, but recommenced in May 2009 under new operator Norfolkline. They ran three sailings a week in each direction.

Norfolkline was taken over by DFDS Seaways, who subsequently reduced the service to freight-only, three sailings a week in each direction.

The service was terminated in 2018 following a fire aboard one of the ships.

In June 2022, it was reported that talks were underway to restore the ferry route, with DFDS operating a freight service from early 2023, with passenger service by summer 2023.

The Scottish National Housing Company 

The Scottish National Housing Company (SNHC) was a public utility company set up in 1915 to provide houses for employees at Rosyth naval dockyard; shares were taken by Dunfermline town council with the Public Works Loan Board lending the money. Work on building housing for the dockyard workers had been delayed due to disagreements between the Admiralty and Dunfermline council about who should take financial responsibility (1909-15).  Some workers were accommodated in temporary huts called East and West Bungalow village and nicknamed 'tin town'.

From the first proposals for a new settlement at Rosyth, it was suggested it should be developed along Garden City lines.  The town planning scheme was passed in 1915 and the first houses were occupied in 1916.  Raymond Unwin was appointed advisor to the Admiralty. Rosyth became the largest of the permanent First World War housing schemes in Scotland.  Unwin's assistant Alfred Hugh Mottram worked on the layout and became the SNHC's main architect, designing over 1,400 cottage-style houses.  Mottram also designed the B-listed Rosyth Parish Church (1930).

Economic redevelopment

Scottish Enterprise Fife is now working in partnership with various private sector organisations to explore the future development of Rosyth. The agency is looking at ways to expand the ferry services to other European and domestic ports. It also wants to help create new business infrastructure in and around Rosyth – which in turn will bring economic benefits to Fife and beyond.

Three areas around the port of Rosyth are being developed:

Surplus land and buildings owned by engineering giant Babcock, which operates the naval dockyard, is being offered to external companies.

The main dock area – operated by Forth Ports – is ripe for further development. Since opening in 1997, the port has seen rising timber and cargo vessels use the facility. Its warehouse and logistics facilities make an ideal choice for exporters and importers.

A private developer owned site is being developed into an £80 million business park – called Rosyth Europarc. Companies like Intelligent Finance and Bank of Scotland are on site. To complement these developments, a new £8.4 million road is being built to provide an enhanced link to the nearby M90 motorway. Work began on the new road early in 2006, and it was completed in spring 2007.

Local company Cameron Harris Design & Build are currently developing prestigious office pavilions to the North of Rosyth at Masterton and are about to bring to the market industrial premises at Admiralty Park, where they have previously constructed premises for IDS and also Acorn Pets. Cameron Harris have lodged planning permission for the next phase of works at Admiralty Park, Rosyth which will home up to 60 jobs, the first company to relocate there is a well established European company who will use Rosyth as their UK headquarters.

In 1999 Roger Byron-Collins' Welbeck Estate Group acquired the entire naval ratings' married quarter housing estate on the Royal Navy facility at Rosyth from the MOD's Property Services Agency in Rosyth. Through their sales company Welbeck Homes all the housing was upgraded and sold to local buyers and the residential part of the estate is in civilian ownership.

Sports

The town has a rugby union club, Rosyth Sharks, which play in the  league and a football club Rosyth FC that plays in the East of Scotland Football League.

Notable people
Robert Buchan, Scottish-Canadian mining engineer, businessman and philanthropist; Chancellor of Heriot-Watt University
Gregory Burke, playwright, author of Black Watch.
Stevie Crawford, professional footballer; former Dunfermline Athletic and Scotland striker
John Hay Munro, author and evangelist
Barbara Dickson, singer and actor
Andy Penman, professional footballer; former Scotland

See also

 Morthouse – located in the Church of Scotland cemetery.

References

Towns in Fife
Ports and harbours of Scotland
Port cities and towns in Scotland
Port cities and towns of the North Sea